Kalameny is a village and municipality in Ružomberok District in the Žilina Region of northern Slovakia.

History
In historical records the village was first mentioned in 1264.

Geography
The municipality lies at an altitude of 568 metres and covers an area of 8.703 km². It has a population of about 480 people.

Genealogical resources

The records for genealogical research are available at the state archive "Statny Archiv in Bytca, Slovakia"
 Roman Catholic church records (births/marriages/deaths): 1750-1921 (parish B)
 Lutheran church records (births/marriages/deaths): 1783-1895 (parish B)

See also
 List of municipalities and towns in Slovakia

External links
 https://web.archive.org/web/20070513023228/http://www.statistics.sk/mosmis/eng/run.html
 Surnames of living people in Kalameny

Villages and municipalities in Ružomberok District